Turbo boost or Turbo Boost may refer to:

 Turbocharger boost, the amount by which intake manifold pressure exceeds atmospheric pressure in a turbocharger
 Intel Turbo Boost, a technology that enables a processor to run above its base operating frequency
 Turbo boost, a feature of the fictional vehicle KITT in the Knight Rider TV series

See also
 Turbo button, a button on a PC which provides two run states for the computer, normal (full) speed, or a reduced speed